Parkwood E-ACT Academy is a secondary school located in Sheffield, South Yorkshire, England. It opened as Parkwood High School, a "fresh start" school, in September 2000, following the closure of Herries School. On 1 September 2009, it became Parkwood Academy. Feeder primary schools include Pye Bank, Longley and Watercliffe Meadow. The principal is Gemma Cottingham. The school was featured in an episode of Channel 4's documentary series The Secret Teacher in 2019.

The academy is sponsored by E-ACT, and moved into a new building in April 2012.

References

External links
School website

Academies in Sheffield
Secondary schools in Sheffield
E-ACT
Educational institutions established in 2009
2009 establishments in England